Salim Ben Boina (born 19 July 1991) is a professional footballer who plays as a goalkeeper for Championnat National 3 club Marseille Endoume. Born in France, he represents the Comoros at international level.

Club career
Born in Marseille, Boina has played for Montredon Bonneveine, Gardanne, Consolat Marseille, Martigues, Athlético Marseille, and Marseille Endoume, all of which are in the Bouches-du-Rhône department of France.

International career 
Ben Boina made his international debut for Comoros in 2015, and was a squad member at the 2021 Africa Cup of Nations.

Notes

References

1991 births
Living people
French footballers
Footballers from Marseille
French sportspeople of Comorian descent
Citizens of Comoros through descent
Comorian footballers
Association football goalkeepers
Comoros international footballers
Championnat National players
Championnat National 2 players
AS Gardanne players
FC Martigues players
Athlético Marseille players
US Marseille Endoume players
2021 Africa Cup of Nations players